Borrmann is a German surname. Notable people with the surname include:

Elmar Borrmann (born 1957), German fencer
Gerhard Borrmann (1908–2006), German physicist
Joachim Borrmann, recipient of Knight's Cross of the Iron Cross
Mechtild Borrmann (born 1960), German writer, author of several detective novels
Richard Borrmann (1852–1931), German architect and classical archaeologist
Robert Borrmann, birth name of Eniac, a German composer and record producer specializing in house music and techno
Bettina Borrmann Wells (born 1874), Bavarian-born English suffragette who toured the United States as an organizer and lecturer

See also
the Borrmann effect (after Gerhard Borrmann), the anomalous increase in the intensity of X-rays transmitted through a crystal when it is being set up for Bragg reflection
Borman
Bormann

German-language surnames